Samkelisiwe Zulu (born 14 April 1990) is a Zimbabwean footballer. She represented Zimbabwe in the football competition at the 2016 Summer Olympics.

References

1990 births
Living people
Zimbabwean women's footballers
Women's association football forwards
Zimbabwe women's international footballers
Olympic footballers of Zimbabwe
Footballers at the 2016 Summer Olympics